Virgaviridae is a family of positive-strand RNA viruses. Plants serve as natural hosts. The name of the family is derived from the Latin word virga (rod), as all viruses in this family are rod-shaped. There are currently 59 species in this family, divided among seven genera.

Structure
Viruses in Virgaviridae are non-enveloped, with rigid helical rod geometries, and helical symmetry. The diameter is around 20-25 nm, and virions have a central "canal." Genomes are linear, single-stranded, positive sense RNA with a 3'-tRNA like structure and no polyA tail. They may be in one, two, or three segments, depending on the genus. Coat proteins are about 19–24 kiloDaltons.

Life cycle
Viral replication is cytoplasmic. Entry into the host cell is achieved by penetration into the host cell. Replication follows the positive stranded RNA virus replication model. Positive stranded RNA virus transcription is the method of transcription. Translation takes place by leaky scanning, and  suppression of termination. The virus exits the host cell by tripartite non-tubule guided viral movement, and monopartite non-tubule guided viral movement.
Plants serve as the natural host.

Taxonomy 
Viruses include in the family Virgaviridae are characterized by unique alpha-like replication proteins.

The following genera are recognized:
 Furovirus
 Goravirus
 Hordeivirus
 Pecluvirus
 Pomovirus
 Tobamovirus
 Tobravirus

Notes
The genus Benyvirus, although its members are rod shaped and infect plants, is not included in this family as its proteins appear to be only very distantly related, but is instead included in the family Benyviridae. Another related genus is Charavirus. Viruses of this genus infect charophyte algae.

References

External links
 ICTV Online Report: Virgaviridae
 Viralzone: Virgaviridae
 ICTV Virus Taxonomy Profile: Virgaviridae

 
Viral plant pathogens and diseases
Virus families
Riboviria